Brice Feillu (born 26 July 1985) is a French former road racing cyclist, who rode professionally between 2009 and 2019 for the , , ,  and  teams.

Career
Born in Châteaudun, Eure-et-Loir, he is the younger brother of Romain Feillu, who was also a road racing cyclist. Brice Feillu achieved his greatest success with a stage victory on Stage 7 (from Barcelona to Arcalis, Andorra) of the 2009 Tour de France, the highest finish of that year's tour and the longest stage.

Feillu joined  for the 2014 season, after his previous team –  – folded at the end of the 2013 season.

Major results

2007
 7th Overall Tour Alsace
1st  Young rider classification
 10th Overall Tour du Haut-Anjou
2008
 2nd Overall Paris–Corrèze
 6th Overall Tour Alsace
1st Stage 5
2009
 1st Stage 7 Tour de France
2010
 8th Grand Prix d'Ouverture La Marseillaise
 8th Grand Prix de Plumelec-Morbihan
2012
 6th Overall Volta a Portugal
 8th Klasika Primavera
 10th Overall Circuit de Lorraine
2014
 2nd Overall Boucles de la Mayenne
2015
 1st  Mountains classification, Tour de l'Ain
 9th Overall Four Days of Dunkirk
2016
 1st  Mountains classification, Tour de Luxembourg
 9th Overall Tour de Savoie Mont-Blanc
2017
 1st  Mountains classification, Tour de Luxembourg
 4th Overall Route du Sud
 6th Overall Tour de l'Ain

Grand Tour general classification results timeline

References

External links

1985 births
Living people
People from Châteaudun
French male cyclists
French Tour de France stage winners
Sportspeople from Eure-et-Loir
Cyclists from Centre-Val de Loire